Timorim is a moshav shitufi in central Israel. Located on the Israeli coastal plain around a kilometer south of the Malakhi Junction, near the town of Kiryat Malakhi, it falls under the jurisdiction of Be'er Tuvia Regional Council.

The village also functions as a community settlement for its community of non-members

History
It was established in 1948 by a gar'in of youth from South Africa, Romania and Egypt from the youth movement HaNoar HaTzioni as a kibbutz on Shimron Hill in the Lower Galilee, in the area now covered by the community settlement of Timrat. It was named after a carving in the shape of a palm in the temple: 1 Kings 6:29.
It was built on the land belonging to the depopulated Palestinian village of Tall al-Turmus. 
In 1953 it was reorganized as a moshav shitufi, one of the first in the country. In 1954 the settlement moved to its current location due to a shortage of land at its original site.

Economy
Timorim's income in 2005 derived mainly from industry (74%), with additional 15% from agriculture and 11% from outside work of Timorim members and other sources. Timorim has two industries: "Tomer Plastics" manufacturing plastic furniture for the institutional market (est. 1961-1975) and "Tomer 2000" manufacturing metal pipes (est. 1978). Agriculture includes cotton, citrus, olives, and walnuts. A dairy herd of 450 head is managed jointly with Kibbutz Hulda.

Notable residents
Assaf Lowengart (born 1998), baseball player on Team Israel
Michael Harris (born 1956), public policy scholar and universities executive

References

External links
Official website 

Moshavim
Former kibbutzim
Populated places established in 1948
Populated places established in 1954
Populated places in Southern District (Israel)
1948 establishments in Israel
1954 establishments in Israel
Egyptian-Jewish culture in Israel
Romanian-Jewish culture in Israel
South African-Jewish culture in Israel